The 1912 Quebec general election was held on May 15, 1912, to elect members of the 13th Legislative Assembly of the Province of Quebec, Canada.  The incumbent Quebec Liberal Party, led by Lomer Gouin, was re-elected, defeating the Quebec Conservative Party, led by Joseph-Mathias Tellier.

Redistribution of ridings

An Act passed prior to the election increased the number of MLAs from 74 to 81 through the following changes:

Results

See also
 List of Quebec premiers
 Politics of Quebec
 Timeline of Quebec history
 List of Quebec political parties
 13th Legislative Assembly of Quebec

Further reading

References

Quebec general election
Elections in Quebec
General election
Quebec general election